Mistberget is a mountain in Akershus in southeastern Norway, and is visible from most places in Romerike.  Near the top is a fire tower dating from 1938 and a TV transmitter mast.

Mountains of Viken